Edward Ellerker Williams (22 April 1793 – 8 July 1822) was a retired army officer who became a friend of Percy Bysshe Shelley in the final months of his life and died with him.

Early life 
Edward Williams was born in India, the son of an East India Company's army officer, John Williams. His family sent him to England where he attended Eton College, and then, at the age of 14, he entered the Royal Navy. His father died at sea in 1809, and with a comfortable settlement from the will, Williams joined the Eighth Light Dragoons of the East India Company's army in India as a cornet in 1811.

He served under his half-brother and was promoted to lieutenant in 1813. Williams's Sporting Sketches during a Short Stay in Hindustane contains drawings and journal descriptions of places and events during a leave of absence he took in 1814. The original copy of this notebook is in the Bodleian Library at the University of Oxford. He remained with his regiment until 1817 and retired on half-pay on 28 May 1818. During his time in India he met and served with Thomas Medwin, the cousin of Shelley.

Williams returned to England, taking with him Jane Johnson, the wife of another army officer, née Cleveland (1798–1884), who told him her husband mistreated her and that she was justified in leaving him. Some time before September 1818, she began using the name Jane Williams, and hereafter they presented themselves as Mr. and Mrs. Williams.

Friendship with Medwin and Trelawny

In 1819 Thomas Medwin (left) returned to London and persuaded the Williamses to travel with him to Geneva, where they lived until September 1820. In February Jane and Edward's first child, Edward Medwin Williams (d.1897), was born. Williams also wrote an article on big game hunting for a Swiss encyclopaedia, Bibliotèque universelle des sciences, belles-lettres, et des arts.

Medwin left, and the Williamses moved first to Chalon and then to Italy, where they met with Medwin again in January 1821 in Pisa. Medwin introduced them to Shelley's circle, and Williams became a close companion of Shelley, writing a play under his tutelage, The Promise, or a Year, a Month and a Day, which he sent to Covent Garden, although it was rejected. The Williamses' second child, Jane Rosalind (d.1880), was born on 16 March.

Williams met Lord Byron in November 1821 and Edward John Trelawny in January 1822. Whilst Mary Shelley was struggling to overcome the effects of another miscarriage, Shelley developed what one biographer has termed an "escapist crush" on Jane Williams, addressing many of his poems to her.

Death

On 1 July 1822, Williams and Shelley, along with a friend, Captain Daniel Roberts (Royal Navy officer), and Charles Vivian, a young Cornish boatman, sailed Shelley's boat, Don Juan, to Leghorn. Shelley, Williams and Vivian set sail back on 8 July, but the boat sank in a squall, and they were drowned. Their bodies washed ashore, and Williams was recognized by Trelawny by a boot and a scarf. The bodies were buried temporarily in the sand where they were discovered until Trelawny obtained permission to cremate them, whereupon they were exhumed, and Williams's body was burnt in Tuscany on 15 August. Williams's ashes were carried back to England by Jane, where eventually, she became the wife of another friend of Shelley, Thomas Jefferson Hogg. On her death his ashes were buried with her in Kensal Green Cemetery.

Whilst in Italy, Williams kept a brief journal, which has since provided another sidelight on the lives of Shelley, Byron and Edward John Trelawny.

The closeness of the relationship between the Williamses and Shelleys is shown in many contemporary documents, including Williams's Journal, Mary Shelley's Journal, Trelawny's Recollections, the Letters of the Shelleys and Byron, and also in many biographies about the members of Shelley & Byron's Pisan Circle.

Journal and notebooks 

Williams produced at least four journals or notebooks in addition to Sporting Sketches during a Short Stay in Hindustane. The original copies can be viewed at three libraries:

Journal (21 October 1821 – 4 July 1822) recording his day-to-day activities during the eight-month period before the fatal drowning accident on 8 July 1822 is part of the Special Manuscript Collection at the British Library, London (Add. 36622).

Notebook (circa. 1819 – 1822) containing many sketches, botanical specimens, fragments of poems, and one particular pencil portrait that might be of Shelley is now part of the Donald Prell Collection of Edward John Trelawny at the Honnold/Mudd Special Collections at the Libraries of the Claremont Colleges, Claremont, California.
http://ccdl.libraries.claremont.edu/cdm4/browse.php?CISOROOT=/joe

Notebook (28 May – 2 June 1819) recording his travels on the continent with his friends and family, manuscript in the Carl H. Pforzheimer Collection of Shelley and His Circle at the New York Public Library (call number S’ANA 0399)

Bibliography 
Maria Gisborne & Edward E. Williams, Their Journals and Letters, Edited by Frederick L. Jones, (1951) Norman, University of Oklahoma Press
Journal of Edward Ellerker Williams, with an introduction by Richard Garnett, (1902) London, Elkin Mathews
Shelley and His Circle 1773-1822, Edited by Donald H. Reiman, Cambridge, Harvard University Press Vol. IV, pp. 816–829
Carol L. Thoma, Williams, Edward Ellerker (1793–1822), Oxford Dictionary of National Biography, Oxford University Press, 2004 accessed 3 Jan 2008

References

External links
 Edward Ellerker Williams Notebook in the Donald Prell Edward Trelawny Collection at the Claremont Colleges Digital Library.
 Sporting Sketches during a Short Stay in Hindustane

English diarists
1793 births
1822 deaths
Deaths by drowning
19th-century diarists